Route 340 is a provincial highway situated in the Montérégie region of Quebec west of Montreal. It runs for just over 40  kilometers from the Ontario-Quebec border in Saint-Télesphore (as a continuation of Stormont, Dundas and Glengarry County Road 18) and ends in Vaudreuil-Dorion at the junction of Autoroute 20.

Municipalities along Route 340

 Saint-Télesphore
 Saint-Polycarpe
 Sainte-Justine-de-Newton
 Saint-Clet
 Les Cèdres
 Saint-Lazare
 Vaudreuil-Dorion

Major intersections

See also
 List of Quebec provincial highways

References

External links 
 Official Transport Quebec Road Map 
 Route 340 on Google Maps

340